European route E70 is an A-Class West-East European route, extending from A Coruña in Spain in the west to the Georgian city of Poti in the east.

Itinerary 
The E 70 routes through ten European countries, and includes one sea-crossing, from Varna in Bulgaria to Samsun in Turkey. 

: A Coruña - Baamonde
: Baamonde - Gijón - Torrelavega - Bilbao
: Bilbao -  Eibar
: Eibar (Start of Concurrency with ) - Donostia/San Sebastián - Irún

: Hendaye - Bayonne (End of Concurrency with ) - Bordeaux
: Bordeaux
: Bordeaux (End of Concurrency with )
: Bordeaux - Libourne
: Libourne - Brive-la-Gaillarde
: Brive-la-Gaillarde - Saint-Germain-les-Vergnes
:  Saint-Germain-les-Vergnes ( - Combronde
:  Combronde - Clermont-Ferrand
: Clermont-Ferrand - Balbigny
: Balbigny - Saint-Étienne
: Saint-Étienne - Saint-Chamond
: Saint-Chamond - Givors
: Givors - Saint-Priest
: Lyon (Start of Concurrency with ) - Bourgoin-Jallieu (End of Concurrency with ) - Chambéry
: Chambéry
: Chambéry - Modane
: Modane

: Bardonecchia
: Bardonecchia - Torino
: Torino
: Torino - Asti (Start of concurrency with ) - Alessandria (End of concurrency with ) - Tortona - Piacenza - Brescia
: Brescia - Verona - Venice (Start of concurrency with ) - Palmanova (End of concurrency with ) - Sistiana
: Sistiana - Trieste
: Trieste (Start of concurrency with )

: Sežana - Divača
: Divača - Ljubljana (End of concurrency with )
: (Ljubljana Ring Road
: Ljubljana - Čatež ob Savi

: Bregana - Zagreb (Zagreb bypass ) - Okučani - Slavonski Brod - Donji Andrijevci - Lipovac

: Batrovci - Belgrade
: Belgrade - Vatin

: Moravița - Timișoara
: Timișoara - Lugoj - Drobeta-Turnu Severin - Filiași - Craiova - Alexandria - București
: București (Towards )
: București (Start of concurrency with ) - Giurgiu

: Ruse (End of concurrency with ) - Shumen
: Shumen - Varna
: Varna

Gap (Black Sea)
 Varna -  Samsun; no direct ferry link; ferry to Poti at east end of E70
 

: Samsun - Ordu - Giresun - Trabzon (Start of Concurrency with ) - Hopa

: Sarpi - Batumi - Kobuleti - Poti (End of Concurrency with )

References

External links 
 UN Economic Commission for Europe: Overall Map of E-road Network (2007)

70
E070
E070
E070
E070
E070
E070
E070
E070
E070
E070
E070